The Petroleum Price Board (Petroleumsprisrådet) is a Norwegian government agency responsible for setting norm prices for petroleum produced on the Norwegian continental shelf. The Board has six permanent members, including four government-appointed independent experts and one representative each from the Ministry of Finance and the Ministry of Petroleum and Energy. The Board meets quarterly.

References

Government agencies of Norway
Energy in Norway
Petroleum economics